The Northwestern State University athletic teams go by the Demons, with women's athletic teams generally called the Lady Demons, and its mascot is Vic the Demon. Once a member of the SIAA conference, the school now competes in the Southland Conference.

Sports sponsored

Baseball

The Northwestern State Demons baseball team represents Northwestern State University in Natchitoches, Louisiana. The team is a member of the Southland Conference, which is part of the NCAA Division I. The team plays its home games at H. Alvin Brown–C. C. Stroud Field.

Men's basketball

The Northwestern State Demons basketball team represents Northwestern State University in Natchitoches, Louisiana. The school's team currently competes in the Southland Conference, which is part of the NCAA Division I. The team plays its home games at Prather Coliseum.

On March 17, 2006, NSU's 14th-seeded basketball team shocked the college basketball world by defeating 3rd-seeded, 11th-ranked, Big Ten Conference tournament champion Iowa in the first round of the 2006 NCAA men's basketball tournament on a late three-pointer by Jermaine Wallace. NSU was the lowest-seeded team to advance to the second round in 2006. NSU's men's basketball team also won the inaugural play-in game, beating the Winthrop University Eagles 71–67 in 2001 NCAA men's basketball tournament to advance to the 16th-seeded spot. In doing so, the Demons became the first #16 seed to earn a victory in the NCAA Tournament.

Women's basketball

The Northwestern State Lady Demons basketball team represents Northwestern State University in Natchitoches, Louisiana. The school's team currently competes in the Southland Conference, which is part of the NCAA Division I. The team plays its home games at Prather Coliseum.

Football

The Northwestern State Demons football team represents Northwestern State University located in Natchitoches, Louisiana. The team competes in the Southland Conference, which is part of Division I FCS. The team plays its home games at Harry Turpin Stadium.

Softball

The Northwestern State Lady Demons softball team represents Northwestern State University located in Natchitoches, Louisiana. The team competes in the Southland Conference, which is part of the NCAA Division I. The team plays its home games at Lady Demon Diamond.

Traditions

Fork 'em
"Fork 'em" is a hand gesture and slogan used by students at Northwestern State University in their celebration of sports teams. The gesture is performed by curling the ring and middle fingers under the thumb against the palm, and extending the pinky and index fingers – identical in fashion to the University of Texas "Hook 'em Horns" gesture except the index finger and pinky are held straight up and down and not out to the side.

Notable players and coaches
 Kenta Bell, U.S. Olympian
 LaMark Carter, U.S. Olympian
 Joe Delaney, former Kansas City Chiefs running back
 George Doherty, former head football coach of the Demons. NSU athletic offices are housed in the George Doherty Wing.
 Mark Duper, Miami Dolphins wide receiver
 D'or Fischer (born 1981), American-Israeli basketball player
 Bobby Hebert, former New Orleans Saints quarterback
 Charlie Hennigan, former Houston Oilers wide receiver
 Jeremy Lane, former Seattle Seahawks cornerback
 Brian Lawrence, MLB pitcher
 Terrence McGee, former Buffalo Bills cornerback and Pro Bowl kickoff returner
 Ed Orgeron, LSU Tigers head football coach
 Don Shows, Demons offensive line coach in 1988 season, won conference championship; later at West Monroe High School from 1989 to 2012, fourth winningest coach in Louisiana state high school football history
 Jackie Smith, St. Louis Cardinals and Dallas Cowboys tight end
 Lee Smith, former Major League relief pitcher
 John Stephens, New England Patriots running back

See also
List of NCAA Division I institutions

References

External links
 

 
Sports in Natchitoches, Louisiana
Sports teams in Louisiana